Set Us Free is the fifth album by American organist Reuben Wilson recorded in 1971 and released on the Blue Note label.

Reception
The Allmusic review by Thom Jurek awarded the album 4 stars and stated "it's a wildly textured and seamless aural meld of gritty B-3 jams, smooth yet psychedelic soul, rock, pop, and funk... somehow, this ambitious, lushly orchestrated album not only sounds current, but still ahead of its time. Highly recommended". The song "We're in Love" has been sampled multiple times, most famously by DJ Premier on Nas' 1994 debut album Illmatic in the song "Memory Lane (Sittin' in da Park)". It was also sampled in the song "I Ain't the Damn One" by rapper Scientifik.

Track listing
All compositions by Reuben Wilson except where noted
 "Set Us Free" (Eddie Harris) - 5:10
 "We're in Love" - 3:30
 "Sho-Nuff Mellow" - 4:34
 "Mr. Big Stuff" (Joseph Broussard, Carol Washington, Ralph Williams) - 4:36
 "Right on with This Mess" (W. Marcus Bey) - 4:32
 "Mercy Mercy Me (The Ecology)" (Marvin Gaye) - 3:41
 "Tom's Thumb" - 5:33
Recorded at Rudy Van Gelder Studio, Englewood Cliffs, New Jersey on July 23, 1971.

Personnel
Reuben Wilson - organ
Jerome Richardson - tenor saxophone, soprano saxophone
Eugene Bianco - harp
David Spinozza - guitar, electric sitar
Richard Davis - bass
Jimmy Johnson - drums
Ray Armando - conga
Gordon "Specs" Powell - percussion
Wade Marcus - arranger
Mildred Brown, Rosalyn Brown, Naomi Thomas - vocals (tracks 2, 4 & 6)
Jimmy Briggs - vocal arranger (tracks 2, 4 & 6)

References

Blue Note Records albums
Reuben Wilson albums
1971 albums
Albums recorded at Van Gelder Studio
Albums arranged by Wade Marcus
Albums produced by George Butler (record producer)